Comparettia falcata is an epiphytic species of orchid. It is the type species of the genus Comparettia. It is widespread across much of the warmer parts of the Western Hemisphere: Mexico, Belize, Central America, the West Indies and South America.

References 

falcata
Orchids of South America
Orchids of Central America
Orchids of Belize
Orchids of Mexico
Flora of the Caribbean
Plants described in 1836
Flora without expected TNC conservation status